Midnight Star is an American group that had a string of hits in the 1980s.

Band history
The group was formed in 1976 at Kentucky State University by trumpeter Reggie Calloway, vocalist Belinda Lipscomb, guitarist/drummer/vocalist Melvin Gentry, bassist Kenneth Gant, multi-instrumentalist Bill Simmons, keyboard player/vocalist Bo Watson and guitarist/keyboardist Jeff Cooper, as a self-contained group. They later added non-KSU student trombonist Vincent Calloway (Reginald's younger brother). A 1978 New York City showcase inspired SOLAR Records chief Dick Griffey to sign the group. They released their debut album The Beginning (1980) with some guest studio musicians. In 1981 their second album, released on Solar Records, Standing Together, reached position #54 on the U.S. R&B chart. In 1982 they released a third album, Victory.  Using elected band leader Reggie Calloway's production skills, Midnight Star hit the U.S. R&B chart with early singles "Hot Spot" and "I've Been Watching You". Drummer Bobby Lovelace joined the group in late 1982, freeing Gentry to sing and play guitar exclusively.

Midnight Star's fourth album, No Parking on the Dance Floor, was released in 1983, and proved to be their breakout. Featuring a mix of R&B and funk with vocoder vocals, the album hit No. 2 on the Billboard magazine Top Black Albums chart and No. 27 on the Billboard Top LPs & Tape and it went double platinum in the U.S. Its first single, "Freak-A-Zoid", went to No. 2 on the U.S. Black Singles chart. The Washington Post's J. D. Considine argues that this song served to "establish [the] group's stylistic identity" and that it "put Midnight Star on the pop music map because it so perfectly combined the group's technopop tendencies with its R&B roots" Other singles from the album included "Wet My Whistle", and the title track. The album's three singles all charted on Billboard's Hot 100, Black Singles and dance charts. and the album tracks "Slow Jam" (co-written by Kenneth "Babyface" Edmonds) and "Electricity" received significant airplay.

Their next album, Planetary Invasion, had the same "basic sound...from the chattering electronic pulse to Vincent Calloway's chatty vocoder" as the band's previous release and also went platinum. The first single, "Operator" made the pop Top 20 and the number one spot on the R&B chart; it remains the band's only Billboard Hot 100 Top 40 hit to date.

In 1985, Kool & the Gang, Midnight Star, Shalamar and Klymaxx performed at the Marriott Convention Center in Oklahoma City.  The band continued on to concerts in San Antonio and Little Rock.

In 1986 the band released their sixth album, Headlines, which was their third album to sell at least gold. It was to be their last with the Calloway brothers. Due to irreconcilable differences with the other members, Reggie was out of the group and Vincent left shortly thereafter. They achieved their biggest success in the UK with "Midas Touch", which made #8, and "Headlines", a #16 hit earlier the same year. Without the Calloways who formed the group Calloway and release an album that spawned the 1990 hit single "I Wanna Be Rich", Midnight Star recorded two more albums, the self-titled Midnight Star and Work It Out. These two albums proved not as successful as their previous three releases, but the singles "Don't Rock the Boat" and "Snake in the Grass" did reach the top ten on the R&B singles chart. The group went on a long hiatus, though they never officially broke up.

The group reunited in 2000 with many of the original members (including all of the singers) and released the album 15th Avenue two years later. Since then, the group has toured sporadically, most recently with a lineup that includes Belinda Lipscomb, Kenneth Gant, Melvin Gentry, Bo Watson, and Bobby Lovelace, with Bill Simmons sometimes joining as well.

Outside work
Outside of Midnight Star, a few band members have contributed to other projects. Bo Watson co-wrote a few songs for singer Toni Braxton. He co-wrote the Babyface duet "Give U My Heart" and "Love Shoulda Brought You Home" from the Boomerang soundtrack as well as the song "Spending My Time With You" on Braxton's self-titled debut. Watson also helped write other songs such as "Turn Down the Lights" for Shanice, "Rock Steady" for The Whispers and "Meeting in the Ladies' Room" for Klymaxx.

Reggie and Vincent Calloway went on to produce such acts as Teddy Pendergrass and the Deele.

Belinda Lipscomb appears on Reflection Eternal's 2010 album Revolutions Per Minute on the album track "Long Hot Summer" as well as the second single "In This World". Lipscomb also contributed additional background vocals on "Toyz N Da Hood" from Snoop Dogg's 2011 album Doggumentary. Belinda Liscomb also wrote the track "Let's Keep Dancin'" by Carrie Lucas for her final LP "Horsin' Around".

Discography

Studio albums

Compilation albums
Greatest Hits  (1987, SOLAR)
Anniversary Collection (1999, The Right Stuff)
The Best of Midnight Star (2002, EMI-Capitol)
Ultimate Collection (2006, Capitol)

Singles

References

External links
Official website
 Midnight Star Facebook Page

American funk musical groups
African-American musical groups
Musical groups from Kentucky
American soul musical groups
SOLAR Records artists
Musical groups established in 1976
1976 establishments in Kentucky